Patricia Cano is a Peruvian Canadian singer and actress from Sudbury, Ontario, most noted for her musical theatre performances in the stage musicals of Tomson Highway. She graduated from the University of Toronto in Spanish Literature and Theatre.

Recording and performing a jazz-based style in English, French and Spanish, she has released two albums as a solo artist, and won a Toronto Theatre Critics Award in 2017 as Best Actress in a Musical for her performance in a production of Highway's The (Post) Mistress. She performed the songs from The (Post) Mistress on the album version, which was a shortlisted Juno Award nominee for Aboriginal Album of the Year at the Juno Awards of 2015.

She played a minor role in the television series Météo+, and her music has appeared in the television series Hard Rock Medical. Both series starred musician and actor Stéphane Paquette, who appeared as a duet vocalist on Cano's debut album This Is the New World.

In 2022 she performed the lead vocals on Cree Country, an album of original country songs written by Highway and produced by John Alcorn.

Discography
This is the New World (2009)
The (Post) Mistress (2013) 
Madre Amiga Hermana (2017)
Cree Country (2022)

References

External links
 Official website

Canadian television actresses
Canadian women jazz singers
Canadian world music musicians
Canadian musical theatre actresses
Canadian people of Peruvian descent
French-language singers of Canada
Spanish-language singers of Canada
Actresses from Greater Sudbury
Musicians from Greater Sudbury
Living people
21st-century Canadian women singers
21st-century Canadian actresses
Year of birth missing (living people)